Tulip Time may refer to:

 Tulip Time Festival in  Holland, Michigan, U.S.
 other Tulip festivals
 Tulip Time: The Rise and Fall of the Trio Lescano, a 2008 documentary film

See also
 Tulip mania, a period during the Dutch Golden Age